An integrated route network is one that allows the traveller to experience a safe, convenient, and comfortable trip door-to-door. Segments of journeys are continuous in space, services are scheduled to minimize waiting times, and ticketing or other administrative tasks are reduced to the minimum. The concept may be applied to single transport modes or to combinations. Key elements include coordinated planning, continuous infrastructure, carefully timed operations, and information to users.

Planning

In order to achieve an integrated network including different modes of transport, all agencies responsible for the various modes must work effectively together. If they are fragmented, and especially if they are in direct competition with each other, effective joint working is unlikely.

Traveller information
Prospective travellers must be able to access information about their possible journey. For public transport services, travellers should be able to access real-time information on services, or should (in high-use areas) be confident that the next service will arrive very shortly.

References

Intermodal transport